Ledebouria floribunda is a species of flowering plant in the Asparagaceae family. It is found in Africa.

Uses
The homoisoflavanones 7-O-α-rhamnopyranosyl-(1→6)-β-glucopiranosyl-5-hydroxy-3-(4-methoxybenzyl)-chroman-4-one, 7-O-α-rhamnopyranosyl-(1→6)-β-glucopiranosyl-5-hydroxy-3-(4′-hydroxybenzyl)-chroman-4-one, 5,7-dihydroxy-3-(4′-methoxybenzyl)-chroman-4-one (3,9-dihidroeucomin), 5,7-dihydroxy-6-methoxy-3-(4′-methoxybenzyl)-chroman-4-one, 5,7-dihydroxy 3-(4′-hydroxybenzyl)-chroman-4-one (4,4′-demethyl-3,9-dihydropuctatin), 5,7-dihydroxy-3-(4′-hydroxybenzyl)-6-methoxy-chroman-4-one (3,9-dihydroeucomnalin) and 7-hydroxy-3-(4′-hydroxybenzyl)-5-methoxy-chroman-4-one can be isolated from the bulbs of L. floribunda.

Etymology 
Ledebouria is named for Carl Friedrich von Ledebour (1785–1851),  a botanist who published, among other things, the first complete Russian flora.

References

 Journal of South African Botany. Kirstenbosch 36:251. 1970

External links

floribunda
Plants described in 1970
Taxa named by John Gilbert Baker